"Wow Thing" is a song by South Korean artists Seulgi from Red Velvet, soloist and former I.O.I member Chungha, SinB from Viviz (formerly member of GFriend) and Soyeon from (G)I-dle.  The single was released on 28 September, 2018, by SM Entertainment.

Background
Station Young, made up of four members: Red Velvet's Seulgi, GFriend's SinB, former I.O.I member and soloist Chungha and (G)I-dle's Jeon So-yeon.

Release
The single was released on September 28, 2018, through several music portals including iTunes.

Composition
A bright, R&B-influenced pop song, "Wow Thing" puts the foursome's powerful vocals in the spotlight and showcases their dynamic through its accompanying music video, released through SM Entertainment's Station X O project. The song emphasizes on self-love and confidence in one’s own actions, urging people to be positive while finding their own path.

Members
 Seulgi – member of Red Velvet
 Chungha – soloist, former member of I.O.I
 SinB – member of Viviz, former member of GFriend
 Soyeon – member of (G)I-dle

Music video
The music video was released on September 28, 2018. The MV featured the song's butterfly as a spirit animal flitting about the women as they coolly show off how they're truly "Wow Thing"s around retro-inspired sets. The choreography is both captivating and powerful, with the four punching their fists and grabbing the camera's attention.

Track listing 

 Digital download / streaming

 "Wow Thing" – 2:51
 "Wow Thing (Instrumental)" – 2:51

Credits and personnel 
Credits adapted from Melon.

Studio

 Recorded at In Grid Studio
 Edited at doobdoob Studio
 Engineered for mix at SM BoomingSystem
 Mixed at 821 Sound
 Mastered at 821 Sound Mastering

Personnel

 Seulgivocals, background vocals
 SinBvocals, background vocals
 Chunghavocals, background vocals
 Soyeonvocals, background vocals, lyrics
 Cho Yoon-kyunglyrics
 Karen Ann Poolecomposition
 Anne Judith Wikcomposition
 Sonny J. Masoncomposition, arrangement
 Yoo Young-jinmusic and sound supervision, mixing engineer
 Kim Jin-hwanvocal directing
 Yang Geun-youngbackground vocals
 Woo Min-jungrecording
 Jang Woo-youngdigital editing
 MasterKeymixing
 Kwon Nam-woomastering

Charts

Weekly charts

Monthly charts

References

2018 songs
2018 singles
Chungha songs
Songs written by Jeon So-yeon
Korean-language songs